Stages is a four-CD box set consisting of live performances by Jimi Hendrix covering four years of his career.  Disc one is the complete September 5, 1967, concert in Stockholm.  Disc two is the complete January 29, 1968 (late show) concert in Paris; this was later released on Dagger Records as part of Live in Paris & Ottawa 1968.  Disc three is most of the May 24, 1969, concert in San Diego with "Foxey Lady" missing from the set. Disc four is a majority of the July 4, 1970, concert at the Atlanta International Pop Festival with five songs missing from the set. These additional five songs can be found on the album Freedom: Atlanta Pop Festival, which also presents the performance in the correct playing order.

Stages was released in November 1991 on Reprise Records, and is currently out of print.

Critical reception

In a retrospective review for AllMusic, critic Greg Prato gave the album three out of five stars. He described the recording quality "crystal clear":

Track listing
All tracks written by Jimi Hendrix except where noted.

Personnel

Musicians
Stockholm '67,  Paris '68,  San Diego '69The Jimi Hendrix Experience:
 Jimi Hendrix – guitar, vocals
 Mitch Mitchell – drums
 Noel Redding – bass guitar

Atlanta '70The Cry of Love Tour band:
 Jimi Hendrix – guitar, vocals
 Mitch Mitchell – drums
 Billy Cox – bass guitar, backing vocals

Production
Producer: Alan Douglas
Associate Producer: Bruce Gary
Project Consultant: Michael Fairchild
Mixing Engineer: Mark Linett (San Diego '69 & Atlanta '70)
Assistant Engineer: Michael Kloster (San Diego '69 & Atlanta '70)
Mixed At: Sunset Sound
Mastering: Joe Gastwirt at Ocean View Digital
Album Notes: Michael Fairchild
Photography: Jim Marshall (Stockholm '67), Jean-Pierre Leloir (Paris '68), Barry Wentzell/Repfoto (San Diego '69), Joe Sia (Atlanta '70)
Art Direction: Jeff Gold, Deborah Norcross
Design: Deborah Norcross

References

Compilation albums published posthumously
Jimi Hendrix live albums
1991 live albums
1991 compilation albums
Warner Records live albums
Warner Records compilation albums
Live albums published posthumously